A triazole is a heterocyclic compound featuring a five-membered ring of two carbon atoms and three nitrogen atoms with molecular formula C2H3N3. Triazoles exhibit substantial isomerism, depending on the positioning of the nitrogen atoms within the ring.  

Many triazoles are versatile, biologically active compounds commonly used as fungicides and plant retardants.  However, triazoles are also useful in bioorthogonal chemistry, because the large number of nitrogen atoms causes triazoles to react similar to azides.  Lastly, the many free lone pairs in triazoles make them useful as coordination compounds, although not typically as haptic ligands.

Isomerism 
There are four triazole isomers, which are conventionally divided into two pairs of tautomers.  In the 1,2,3-triazoles, the three nitrogen atoms are adjacent; in the 1,2,4-triazoles, an interstitial carbon separates out one nitrogen atom.  Each category has two tautomers that differ by which nitrogen has a hydrogen bonded to it.

Preparation
There are several methods to prepare triazoles.

1,2,3-Triazoles

1,2,3-Triazoles are usually prepared following (3+2) cycloaddition protocols. A common technique for unsubstituted triazoles is the Huisgen azide-alkyne 1,3-dipolar cycloaddition: a azide and an alkyne react at high temperature to form a ring.  However, the Huisgen strategy produces a mixture of isomers (typically 1,4- and 1,5-disubstituted) when used to produce substituted triazoles.  

In order to selectively prepare a desired isomer, metal catalysts are employed. In the copper-catalysed azide-alkyne cycloaddition (CuAAC), copper(I) salts select for the formation of 1,4-disubstituted 1,2,3-triazoles.  One such catalyst is CuBr(PPh3)3, which is relatively stable towards oxidation even at elevated temperatures and can produce triazoles with a broad range of substituents either in solvent or under neat reaction conditions.  

Conversely, ruthenium catalysts (RuAAC) select for 1,5-disubstituted 1,2,3-triazoles.

1,2,4-Triazoles

Most techniques for producing 1,2,4-triazoles use the free energy of water, either by dehydrating a mixture of amides and hydrazides (the Pellizzari reaction) or imides and alkyl hydrazines (the Einhorn-Brunner reaction).  Of those two, only the Einhorn-Brunner reaction is regioselective.  Recent research has focused on grinding and microwave irradiation as greener substitutes.

Applications
Triazoles are compounds with a vast spectrum of applications, varying from materials (polymers), agricultural chemicals, pharmaceuticals, photoactive chemicals and dyes.

Benzotriazole is used in chemical photography as a restrainer and fog suppressant.

Cyclohexylethyltriazol was briefly used as an alternative to Cardiazol (Metrazol) in convulsive shock therapy treatment of mental illnesses during the 1940s.

Importance in agriculture
Many triazoles have antifungal effects: the triazole antifungal drugs include fluconazole, isavuconazole, itraconazole, voriconazole, pramiconazole, ravuconazole, and posaconazole and triazole plant-protection fungicides include epoxiconazole, myclobutanil, propiconazole, prothioconazole, metconazole, cyproconazole, tebuconazole, flusilazole and paclobutrazol.  

Due to spreading resistance of plant pathogens towards fungicides of the strobilurin class, control of fungi such as Septoria tritici or Gibberella zeae relies heavily on triazoles. Food, like store bought potatoes, contain retardants such as triazole or tetcyclacis.

In addition, paclobutrazol, uniconazole, and triadimefon are used as plant growth retardants.  Brassinazole inhibits brassinosteroid biosynthesis.

Importance in chemical synthesis
The azide alkyne Huisgen cycloaddition is a mild and selective reaction that gives 1,2,3-triazoles as products.  The reaction has been widely used in bioorthogonal chemistry and in organic synthesis. Triazoles are relatively stable functional groups and triazole linkages can be used in a variety of applications, e.g. replacing the phosphate backbone of DNA.

Related heterocycles
 Imidazole, an analog with two nonadjacent nitrogen atoms
 Pyrazole, an analog with two adjacent nitrogen atoms
 Tetrazole, an analog with four nitrogen atoms
 Triazolium salts, substituted analogues that can be used as NHC precursors

External links
 Synthesis of 1,2,3-triazoles (overview of recent methods)
 Synthesis of 1,2,4-triazoles (overview of recent methods)

References

Chemical compounds
Simple aromatic rings
Triazoles